Roger Paris (died April 2019) was a French slalom canoeist who competed from the late 1940s to the late 1950s. He won seven medals at the ICF Canoe Slalom World Championships with five golds (C-2: 1951, 1955; C-2 team: 1949, 1951, 1953) and two silvers (C-2: 1949, C-1 team: 1951).

References

French male canoeists
2019 deaths
Year of birth missing
Medalists at the ICF Canoe Slalom World Championships